That Ragtime Band is a 1913 American short comedy film directed by Mack Sennett and featuring Fatty Arbuckle.

Cast
 Ford Sterling as Prof. Smelts
 Mabel Normand as Mabel
 Nick Cogley as Rival musician
 Alice Davenport
 Roscoe 'Fatty' Arbuckle
 Raymond Hatton
 Edgar Kennedy
 Hank Mann
 Al St. John
 William Hauber as Man in Audience (uncredited)

See also
 Fatty Arbuckle filmography

External links

1913 films
1913 comedy films
1913 short films
Silent American comedy films
American silent short films
American black-and-white films
Films directed by Mack Sennett
American comedy short films
1910s American films